The 1977 World Snooker Championship was a  professional snooker tournament that took place from 18 to 30 April 1977 at the Crucible Theatre in Sheffield. John Spencer won his third World Snooker Championship title by defeating Cliff Thorburn by 25  to 21 in the final. It was the first time that the championship was held at the Crucible, which has remained as the venue for the Championship since then. The tournament was sponsored by cigarette manufacturer Embassy.

Qualifying matches took place from 28 March to 7 April 1977 at Hounslow Civic Centre and at Fisher's Snooker Centre, Acton, to produce eight qualifiers to meet the eight top seeded players from the 1976/1977 snooker world rankings in the main tournament. Ray Reardon, who had won the annual championship each year from 1973 to 1976, was defeated 6–13 by Spencer in the quarter-finals. There were six century breaks at the championship, the highest of which, 135, was scored by Spencer in the sixth frame of his semi-final match against John Pulman. Spencer was the first player to win the championship using a two-piece . As champion, he received £6,000 from the total prize fund of £17,000. The World Championship was the only ranking event of the 1976–77 snooker season.

Overview
Snooker, a cue sport, was founded in the late 19th century by British Army soldiers stationed in India. Joe Davis won the first World Snooker Championship, organised by the Billiards Association and Control Council, in 1927. In the "modern" era of the sport, which started in 1969 when the World Championship reverted to a knockout format, snooker has become increasingly popular worldwide, especially in East and Southeast Asian nations such as China, Hong Kong and Thailand. Since 1977, the championship has been held at the Crucible Theatre in Sheffield, England.

The 1977 championship featured sixteen professional players competing in one-on-one snooker matches in a single-elimination format, each match played over several . Ray Reardon was the defending champion, having defeated Alex Higgins 27-16 in the final of the 1976 World Snooker Championship The top eight players in the 1976/1977 snooker world rankings were exempted to the main tournament, where they each faced a player from a qualifying competition. The championship was organised by the World Professional Billiards and Snooker Association (WPBSA), the governing body for professional snooker, and promoted by Mike Watterson, with sponsorship by cigarette company Embassy. Watterson chose the Crucible after Carol Watterson, his wife, saw a play there and recommended the venue. Watterson booked the venue, at a cost of £6,600, and made personal financial guarantees for the championship, before Embassy's sponsorship had been secured. With audience members purchasing tickets at prices ranging from 75p to £3.50, the event made a surplus of £12,000. Highlights of the semi-finals and final were broadcast on BBC2.

Prize fund
The breakdown of prize money for this year is shown below: 

 Winner: £6,000
 Runner-up: £2,000
 Semi-final: £1,200
 Quarter-final: £750
 Last 16: £350
 Highest break: £500
 Total: £17,000

Tournament summary

Qualifying
The WPBSA first published official world rankings for players on the main tour for the 1976–77 season. Players' performances in the previous three World Snooker Championships (1974, 1975, and 1976) contributed to their points total. These were used for seedings for the tournament. Reardon was seeded first, as defending champion, and was also number one on the ranking list. Originally, the top 14 players were due to be seeded into the last-16 round, but the WPBSA members voted 11–10 to change this so that only the top eight players were exempted to the last-16. The draw for the tournament was conducted by journalist Janice Hale at the Albany Hotel, Birmingham. The 1977 World Championship was the only ranking event of the 1976–77 season.

Qualifying matches were scheduled from 28 March to 7 April 1977 and took place at Hounslow Civic Centre and at Fisher's Snooker Centre, Acton. In the first round, John Virgo eliminated Roy Andrewartha 11–1. In the next round, he won four consecutive frames to go from 7–6 against John Dunning to win 11–6. Willie Thorne won six consecutive frames to complete an 11–6 defeat of Bernard Bennett. Jim Meadowcroft gained a 6–3 lead against Patsy Fagan, but lost 9–11 after the pair had been level at 8–8. David Taylor whitewashed David Greaves 11–0 and made a century break in the fourth frame. there were two other 11–0 whitewashes, by Cliff Thorburn against Chris Ross, and by Dennis Taylor against Jack Karnehm. Veteran Jackie Rea was 8–6 and later 9–8 ahead of Masters champion Doug Mountjoy, a first-season professional who was the reigning World Amateur Champion. Mountjoy won three consecutive frames to take the match 11–9. Maurice Parkin withdrew due to illness, giving John Pulman a walkover. Fagan, Virgo, Mountjoy and Thorne all qualified to make their World Championship debuts.

First round
The first round took place from 18 to 21 April, each match played over three sessions as the best of 25 frames. Reardon and Fagan each won four frames in their first session, before Reardon opened up a 10–7 lead during the second session and completed a win at 13–7 the following day. John Spencer was three frames behind Virgo at 1–4 and 4–7, but won three successive frames to equalise both times, and won 13–9. Graham Miles was a single frame in front of Thorne, at 4–3, after their first session, and from 5–4 ahead won eight frames in a row to seal a win. Pulman led his fellow former world champion Fred Davis 5–3, and then 11–6, finally winning 13–12.

Eddie Charlton won seven of the first eight frames against David Taylor, made a 105 break in the 12th frame, and progress to the next round 13–5. Thorburn won seven successive frames during his 13–6 defeat of Rex Williams. Dennis Taylor concluded a 13–11 win against Perrie Mans with a break of 76, the highest of their match, in the 24th frame. Alex Higgins, the second seed, was 9–7 ahead of Mountjoy after two sessions, but Mountjoy won the opening frame of their third session with a 102 break, and then four of the following five frames. Two visits later, Mountjoy potted the black to seal victory.

Quarter-finals
The quarter-finals were played as best-of-25-frames matches over three sessions, on 23 and 24 April. Reardon was never ahead against Spencer, and was eliminated 6–13. The Snooker Scene match report assessment was that "Even when the title was slipping away from [Reardon] he never seemed able to focus his concentration and stop making mistakes." Pulman reached the semi-finals for the first time since 1970 by defeating Miles 13–10. The reporter for Snooker Scene opined that Pulman played "the smooth, attractive snooker of his great days" in the final session.

Thorburn and Charlton were level several times, at 3–3, 7–7, 10–10 and 11–11. Charlton won the 23rd frame on the final black, but lost the match when Thorburn took the next two frames to win 13–12. Mountjoy took the first three frames against Dennis Taylor but then lost the next five. Each player won four frames in the second session, and then Taylor took the opening frame in the third session to lead 10–7. Mountjoy won the next two frames, each on the final black ball, but lost the 20th frame after he went  the last black. Taylor won 13–11.

Semi-finals

The semi-finals took place from 24 to 27 April as best-of-35-frames matches played over five sessions. Pulman then went 7–3 ahead, before Spencer levelled the match by winning the next four frames. Spencer went on to lead 13–9 and 16–2, and won 18–12, thus qualifying for the final for the first time since 1972.

Thorburn led 4–3 after the first session, and was level at 7–7 with Taylor after the second session. Taylor added three frames to his tally at the start of the fourth session to equalise, and the pair were again level four frames later at 14–14. Four frames into the last session, they were at 16–16. Thorburn produced a break of 111 in the 33rd frame, during which the only time he potted the black ball was at the end, then took an 80–0 points lead in the 34th frame, which ended 98–30, meaning that Thorburn qualified for the final for the first time.

Final
The final took place from 28 to 30 April as the best of 49 frames, refereed by John Smyth. Spencer won his third world title by defeating Thorburn 25–21. The first session ended with Spencer 4–2 ahead after he had won the initial three frames, and he extended his lead to 5–2, before Thorburn took four of the next five frames to leave the score at 6–6 at the day's conclusion. The third session ended with them again tied, at 9–9. Spencer made a break of 105 in the eighteenth frame.

Thorburn gained a 13–11 advantage during the fourth session, and extended this to 15–11, but Spencer won the next four frames to make it 15–15. The players were also level at 18–18 at the start of the last day of the final. Spencer won the first three frames of the day. Thorburn won the following two frames, before Spencer took the 42nd frame with a break of 67, to lead 22–20. Thorburn narrowed his deficit to one frame at 21–22, but saw Spencer win the next three frames to claim victory.

Spencer was the first player to win the title with a two-piece cue. His previous cue was smashed in a car accident just before the 1974 Norwich Union Open, and despite repairs, Spencer was not confident about using it, and purchased the new two-piece implement whilst on tour in Canada. Having made several century breaks with the new cue following his return to England, Spencer decided to use it for the championship only two months before the tournament. A few months after his victory he replaced it with a different one that had been manufactured in Japan. Snooker historian Clive Everton wrote that Spencer "exploded two myths" by winning with a two-piece cue, a type of implement that was generally seen as suitable for pool but not snooker, and having only used it for two months, when most professional players thought it took many months to become proficient with a new cue. Thorburn also used a two-piece cue for the match, as was common in his native Canada.

An article in Snooker Scene contrasted Spencer's playing his earlier World Championship victories, which featured "aggressive" long , to the way he played in 1977, which included fewer long pots and  consistent mid-distance potting, and praised his "coolness and steadiness of nerve" and his choice of which shots to play. The same magazine described Thorburn's strengths at the tournament as "concentration and consistency".

Main draw 
The results for the tournament are shown below. The numbers in brackets denote player seedings, whilst match winners are denoted in bold.

Final
Details for the final are shown below. Numbers in bold and with a  symbol represent frame-winning scores. Numbers in brackets and italics represent breaks of 50 or more.

Qualifying
Results for the qualifying rounds are shown below. Players in bold denote match winners.

Round 1 (Best of 21 frames)

Round 2 (Best of 21 frames)

Century breaks 
There were six century breaks at the championship. The highest break of the tournament was 135, made by John Spencer. 
 135, 105  John Spencer
 111, 100  Cliff Thorburn
 105  Eddie Charlton
 102  Doug Mountjoy

References

World Snooker Championships
World Championship
World Snooker Championship
Sports competitions in Sheffield
World Snooker Championship